Çaybükü can refer to:

 Çaybükü, Bartın
 Çaybükü, Gümüşova